The Absa Puk Oval, formerly known as the Fanie du Toit Sports Complex and the University Oval is a cricket ground in Potchefstroom, South Africa. 
It has hosted senior cricket irregularly since 1982, when Transvaal hosted South African Universities.

In 2010, it was one of three venues used for the ICC Women's Cricket Challenge.
It was also used for the 2017 South Africa Quadrangular Series, contested between the women's teams of India, Ireland, South Africa and Zimbabwe.

References

North-West University
Cricket grounds in South Africa
Sports venues in North West (South African province)
Potchefstroom